The 2014–15 Seattle Impact season was the only season of the Seattle Impact professional indoor soccer club. The Impact, a Pacific Division team in the Major Arena Soccer League, played their home games in the ShoWare Center in the Seattle suburb of Kent, Washington. The Impact were led by owner, player, and head coach Dion Earl. 

After struggles on and off the field, the team's assets were sold to Lane Smith and his Tacoma Stars completed the Impact's schedule. The Stars were led by general manager John Crouch and head coach Darren Sawatzky. Their season was completed with a combined 4–16 record and 5th place in the MASL's Pacific Division.

Season summary
On the field, the Impact lost their first two games then won their next three in a row. These would prove the last wins for the Seattle franchise as they were followed by 8 consecutive losses amid growing turmoil off the field surrounding the team's owner, Dion Earl, as well as its financial struggles. In mid-January, the Impact folded and their position in the MASL was purchased by Lane Smith who used his own Tacoma Stars to fill out the season. While undefeated in their Western Indoor Soccer League, the Stars lost 4 straight in MASL play before beating the Turlock Express in February. Two more losses on the road gave the team a combined 4–16 record and 5th place in the Pacific Division. They did not qualify for the playoffs.

Off-field moves
In May 2014, the Professional Arena Soccer League added six teams from the failed third incarnation of the Major Indoor Soccer League and reorganized as the Major Arena Soccer League. With the league expansion and reorganization, the other Pacific teams for 2014–15 are California-based Ontario Fury, Sacramento Surge, San Diego Sockers, and Turlock Express plus the Las Vegas Legends.

Personnel issues
The planned "Ladies with Impact" dance team disbanded when several members resigned after alleging that Impact owner Dion Earl made sexual advances on them. The dancers also claimed that the team had not paid them for their work. The dance team's former co-captain obtained a sexual harassment protection order against Earl from King County Superior Court Judge Chad Allred on October 22. Earl denies the claims and says the dance team was going to be disbanded for financial reasons. As of late December 2014, no criminal charges had been filed but the King County Prosecuting Attorney's office was reviewing the case. A civil suit against Earl, the team, and several other parties was filed on November 6, 2014.

Just before the regular season started, head coach Jason Dunn and assistant coach Todd Haley left the team. They asserted that the Impact failed to make contractual payments due on October 25. Impact owner Dion Earl announced that he would serve as head coach as well as continue his role as a player. 

On November 21, the Kent Reporter revealed that 22 Seattle Impact players (Ian Weinberg, Taylor Jackson, Brayton Knapp, Steve Mohn, Jeff Bader, Micah Wenzel, Eli Gordley, Mark Lee, Kellan Brown, Kaymran Tairov, Collin Rolfe, Nathan Salveson, Michal Mravec, Marshall Reese, Derek Johnson, Gustovo Bermundez, Francisco Cisnernos, Vince McCluskey, Evan Denmark, Jameal Cox, Tyler Bjork, and Craig Thomlinson) had "left the team in protest of [owner Dion] Earl's conduct". The players wrote a mass resignation letter to the MASL, protesting that "with the daily chaos, firing of our coaches, firing of staff, release of the dance team, poor treatment of players and the polluted media surrounding Dion's sexual assault, bullying, and harassment charges, our reputations are being tarnished and compromised." MASL Commissioner Kevin Milliken declined to comment as the issue was "above my paygrade". Top scorer Gordy Gurson remained with the team, telling the press, "Whatever people want to say, they can say. Right now to me, it's all a bunch of he said-she said."

Sale to Lane Smith
On January 12, 2015, The Seattle Times revealed that Impact owner Dion Earl was negotiating to sell the struggling franchise to Lane Smith, owner of the Tacoma Stars of the semi-pro Western Indoor Soccer League. The sale was completed on January 14 followed by a press conference on January 15 featuring Smith and MASL commissioner Kevin Milliken. The Tacoma Stars purchased the team's assets but did not retain the Impact's staff or players. They completed the Impact's remaining schedule and remained at the ShoWare Center through the end of the season. In May 2015, the team announced it would return to the ShoWare Center for the 2015–16 season.

Schedule

Pre-season

Regular season

Seattle Impact

Tacoma Stars

 Game originally scheduled to be played at Orleans Arena.

References

External links
Tacoma Stars official website
Tacoma Stars at Kent Reporter
Tacoma Stars at The News Tribune

Seattle Impact
Tacoma Stars (2003)
Seattle Impact
Seattle Impact 2014
Seattle Impact 2014
Seattle Impact 2014
Seattle Impact 2014